Christoph Kobald (born 18 August 1997) is an Austrian professional footballer who plays as a defender for Karlsruher SC.

Club career
Kobald made his Austrian Football First League debut for SC Wiener Neustadt on 21 July 2017 in a game against SV Ried.

References

External links
 

1997 births
Living people
Association football defenders
Austrian footballers
SC Ritzing players
SC Wiener Neustadt players
Karlsruher SC players
2. Liga (Austria) players
2. Bundesliga players
3. Liga players
Austrian expatriate footballers
Austrian expatriate sportspeople in Germany
Expatriate footballers in Germany